Radiocentras is a commercial radio station in Lithuania, broadcasting from capital city of Vilnius. Radiocentras is established in 1991.

References

External links

1991 establishments in Lithuania
Radio stations in Lithuania
Mass media in Vilnius